Lee Valley is an unincorporated community in the Canadian province of Ontario. Located in the Sudbury District, the rural area is divided between the town of Espanola and the municipality of Sables-Spanish Rivers.

Demographics 

References

Designated places in Ontario
Communities in Sudbury District